Scotiophyes nebrias is a species of moth of the family Tortricidae. It is found in Brunei on the island of Borneo.

References

	

Moths described in 1984
Archipini